Antonio Riccianti was an Italian painter of the 17th century. He practised in Florence and neighboring towns, and was a pupil of Vincenzo Dandini.

References

17th-century Italian painters
Italian male painters
Italian Baroque painters
Painters from Florence
Year of death unknown
Year of birth unknown